Pterocarpus brenanii is a species of flowering plant in the family Fabaceae. It is found in Mozambique, Zambia, and Zimbabwe.

References

brenanii
Flora of Mozambique
Flora of Zambia
Flora of Zimbabwe
Least concern plants
Taxonomy articles created by Polbot